"Lost" is a song by German rapper Samra and German producer Topic. It was released on 10 December 2020 and has peaked at number 3 on the German charts.

Charts

Weekly charts

Year-end charts

References

2020 songs
2020 singles
Topic (DJ) songs
Songs written by Topic (DJ)